Sparattosyce is a genus of trees in the family Moraceae.  The genus is  endemic to New Caledonia in the Pacific and contains two species. Its closest relative is Antiaropsis from New Guinea.

Species 
The genus consists of the following two species: 

 Sparattosyce balansae 
 Sparattosyce dioica

References

External links 
 

Endemic flora of New Caledonia
Moraceae
Moraceae genera